Andrzej Basik (born 22 March 1960) is a Polish judoka. He competed in the men's heavyweight event at the 1988 Summer Olympics.

References

1960 births
Living people
Polish male judoka
Olympic judoka of Poland
Judoka at the 1988 Summer Olympics
People from Bielsko County
Competitors at the 1986 Goodwill Games